Shaista Aziz (born 1978) is an English journalist, writer, stand-up comedian, Labour Party politician, councillor for Rose Hill and Iffley in Oxford City Council, and former international aid worker of Kashmiri-Pakistani descent.

Early life
Aziz's father arrived in Britain from Kashmir, Pakistan, at the age of 16. She is her parents' only daughter with two younger brothers. Aziz was born and brought up in Oxford, and read for a BA degree in English literature and Women's studies at university.

Journalism career
Aziz has worked as a newsroom journalist for Al Jazeera's English news website in Doha, Qatar, a broadcast journalist and producer for the BBC and has written for New Internationalist magazine. As well as media specialist for Oxfam, Amnesty International, Save the Children and Islamic Relief. She has travelled and worked all over the world from Iraq, Iran, Lebanon, Gaza and Yemen to Haiti, Tajikistan, Burma, Russia, Pakistan and Indonesia.

Aziz writes for The Guardian newspaper, and is a regular panel guest on BBC Radio. In January and February 2011, she wrote a series of scripts for BBC Radio 2's Pause for Thought, In March 2011, she appeared as a guest on BBC Radio 4's Woman's Hour. In August 2011, she appeared on Channel 4's 4thought.tv.

In March 2015, Aziz presented the BBC Three documentary A Nation Divided? The Charlie Hebdo Aftermath, in which she visited France to find out why the country has become so divided, with young Muslims feeling alienated from mainstream society since the Charlie Hebdo shooting.

On 25 June 2017, Aziz appeared on the BBC programme Sunday Morning Live.

Stand-up career
Aziz has performed stand up across the UK, including at the Edinburgh Festival Fringe with the Laughing Cows in August 2010, the Hong Kong International Comedy Festival and the Global Peace and Unity Event in October 2010.

Aziz is writing a sitcom and new comedy material reflecting her experiences of travelling the world.

Political career
Aziz is the Constituency Labour Party Women's Officer for Oxford East Labour Party. In May 2018, in the Oxford City Council election, she was elected as councillor for the Rose Hill and Iffley ward.

Aziz is also a member of the Stop Trump coalition, a coalition of organisations and individuals protesting against U.S. President Donald Trump's planned state visit to the UK.

Anti-racism online petition
Aziz together with her friends Amna Abdullatif and Huda Jawad, dubbing themselves "The Three Hijabis", started an online petition calling for racists to be banned from all football matches in England, in the aftermath of racist abuse targeted at three England players – Marcus Rashford, Bukayo Saka and Jadon Sancho – who missed penalties in the UEFA Euro 2020 Final. Within 48 hours of going live on 12 July 2021, the petition had been signed by more than a million people, Prime Minister Boris Johnson announced on 14 July that Football Banning Orders would be amended to ensure that people guilty of online racist abuse would be banned from football matches.

Awards, nominations and recognition
In 2006, Aziz was elected to the National Union of Journalists Black Members Council.

In May 2010, she reached the final of the Liverpool Comedy Festival Best Newcomer Awards and won the "King Gong" open mic competition at the Manchester Comedy Store. In September 2010, she reached the semi-finals of the Funny Women competition.

Personal life
Aziz is a Muslim. In 2004, she began wearing a hijab. In 2007, she married an Iraqi trauma and orthopedic surgeon in a nikah ceremony in Jordan. In March 2010, she and her husband left London and moved to Manchester.

References

External links

Shaista Aziz on theguardian.com
Aziz, Shaista. How I became a Terror Tourist. Media Monitors Network. 22 July 2002
Aziz, Shaista. Viewpoint: Why I decided to wear the veil. BBC News. 12 September 2003

1978 births
Living people
English Muslims
English people of Pakistani descent
English people of Mirpuri descent
English women journalists
English television journalists
British women television journalists
English columnists
British women columnists
Muslim writers
British Asian writers
Writers of Pakistani descent
21st-century English writers
21st-century English women writers
The Guardian journalists
English women comedians
English stand-up comedians
Muslim female comedians
British comedians of Pakistani descent
Labour Party (UK) councillors
Members of Oxford City Council
Women councillors in England
British politicians of Pakistani descent
British anti-racism activists
People from Oxford